Yablo's paradox is a logical paradox published by Stephen Yablo in 1985. It is similar to the liar paradox. Unlike the liar paradox, which uses a single sentence, this paradox uses an infinite list of sentences, each referring to sentences occurring further down the list. Analysis of the list shows that there is no consistent way to assign truth values to any of its members. Since everything on the list refers only to later sentences, Yablo claims that his paradox is "not in any way circular". However, Graham Priest disputes this.

Statement 

Consider the following infinite set of sentences:
 S1: For each i > 1, Si is not true.
 S2: For each i > 2, Si is not true.
 S3: For each i > 3, Si is not true.
 ...

Analysis 
Assume that there is an n such that Sn is true. Then Sn + 1 is not true, so there is some k > n + 1 such that Sk is true. But Sk is not true because Sn is true and k > n. Assuming Sn to be true implies a contradiction: some later Sk is both true and not true. So our assumption is absurd, and we must conclude that for each i, the sentence Si is not true.  But if each Si is not true, then given that each attributes untruth to later sentences, they are all true. So we have the paradox that each sentence in Yablo's list is true and not true.

References

External links
 
 

Self-referential paradoxes